The New Caledonian wattled bat (Chalinolobus neocaledonicus) is a species of vesper bat, family Vespertilionidae. It is found only in New Caledonia.

Taxonomy
The New Caledonia wattled bat was first described by Swiss naturalist Pierre Revilliod in 1914. It was formerly considered a subspecies of Gould's wattled bat (Chalinolobus gouldii), but evidence for synonymy is weak.
Its species name "neocaledonicus" comes from Ancient Greek néos meaning "new" and the New Latin rendering of "Caledonia," caledonicus; the species name refers to New Caledonia where this species is found.

Description
It is a small species of bat, with a head and body length of only .
Its ears are relatively long, at 

Range and habitat
It is one of nine species of bat found in New Caledonia.
It is among the three species of bat endemic to the territory.

Conservation
It is considered endangered by the IUCN.

Sources 

Chalinolobus
Bats of Oceania
Mammals of New Caledonia
Endemic fauna of New Caledonia
Mammals described in 1914
Taxonomy articles created by Polbot